Selimiye Mosque may refer to:
 Selimie Mosque, Albania
 Selimiye Mosque, Üsküdar, in Istanbul, Turkey
 Selimiye Mosque, Edirne, Turkey (UNESCO World Heritage Site)
 Selimiye Mosque, Konya, Turkey 
 Selimiye Mosque, Nicosia, Cyprus historically known as Cathedral of Saint Sophia